{|

{{Infobox ship characteristics
| Ship displacement= 1800 tonnes
| Ship tons burthen = 700 tons
| Ship length = *Between Perpendiculars
162 Swedish Fot (48.1 metres)
| Ship beam = 45.5 Swedish Fot (13.7 metres)
| Ship height = 
| Ship draft = 
| Ship propulsion = Sails
| Ship crew = 350 sailors, 450 soldiers
| Ship armament = *173 guns.
2 × 48 pundiga cannons (20,4kg, caliber 16 cm)
4 × 36 pundiga cannons (15,3kg, caliber 15 cm)
8 × 24 pundiga cannons (10,2kg, caliber 13 cm)
3 × 24 pundiga cannons with longer barrels (10,2kg, caliber 13 cm)
16 × 12 pundiga cannons (5,1kg, caliber 10 cm)
140 × 2 to 9 pundiga cannons (0,8-3,83kg, caliber 4–9 cm).
| Ship notes = Source for dimensions & Tonnage: "Swedish Unrated Warship Mars (1563", Three Decks - Warships in the Age of Sail]
}}
|}Mars, also known as Makalös ("peerless; astounding"), traditionally referred to as Jutehataren ("The Dane Hater"), was a Swedish warship that was built between 1563 and 1564. She was the leading ship of King Eric XIV of Sweden's fleet, and at 70 meters<ref>[http://threedecks.org/index.php?display_type=show_ship&id=17056 "Swedish Unrated Warship Mars (1563", Three Decks - Warships in the Age of Sail</ref> and equipped with 173 guns, was one of the largest warships of the time, even larger than the famous Swedish ship Vasa. In 1564, during the Northern Seven Years' War, she caught fire and exploded during the First battle of Öland in the Baltic Sea.

Wreck location
On 19 August 2011, it was announced that the Mars had been found at a depth of 75 meters and around 18.5 kilometers north of Öland, after several years of research.  Technical diver Richard Lundgren announced that "Everything suggests that it is indeed the Mars that we have found".

On 1 November 2011 the shipwreck was confirmed to be Mars. According to Richard Lundgren, one of the divers who discovered the wreck, unique ship cannons had been identified along with "other findings" which confirmed the identity.

A production on the Smithsonian channel shown on 6 August 2018 added further evidence of the resting place of Swedish Ship "Mars" . The ship's name was further confirmed by the finding of silver coins within the extensive wreckage of the vessel. The coins were minted by Eric XIV of Sweden the year before the battle in 1563.

The First battle of Öland was the first time that ships used extensive cannon fire rather than boarding (with hand-to-hand fighting) as the means to sink (or capture) an enemy's vessel.

See also
Madre de Deus
Jong (ship)
São Martinho (1580)
Spanish ship Nuestra Señora del Rosario (1587)

References 

Shipwrecks in the Baltic Sea
Ships of the Swedish Navy
Archaeology of shipwrecks
16th-century maritime incidents
Ships built in Sweden
16th-century ships
Age of Sail naval ships of Sweden
Shipwrecks of Sweden